Malvern College Egypt (MCE) is a British international school in cairo located at B2-B3 South Ring Road Cairo, Egypt. It is operated in a partnership between UK-based Malvern College and the Azazy International Group. It opened in September 2016 with 350 students and 35 expatriate teaching staff. Malvern College Egypt offers a British curriculum, The examinations they take are the Cambridge International Examinations, whilst they teach the Edexcel syllabus to pupils. In 2019 Malvern College Egypt became an IB World School offering the Diploma Programme (IBDP) and offering International General Certificate of Secondary Education (IGCSE) and internationally recognised pre-university qualifications including A-Level.

Opening 
The College was formally launched in December 2014 by the former British Ambassador to Egypt, John Casson, at an event also attended by Prince Michael of Kent, members of the British Parliament’s All-Party Parliamentary Group on Egypt, former First Lady of Egypt Jehan Sadat, Egyptian actor Omar Sharif, British actress Liz Hurley and former British Prime Minister Tony Blair.

Governance 
The founding headmaster was Duncan Grice who previously worked at Dulwich College Suzhou.

Staff and facilities 
The College is managed in partnership with a British independent school and in having teaching staff who have exclusively attended British universities. The Malvern College Egypt approach to learning aims to cultivate a thirst for knowledge, a love of learning and the ability to develop a variety of academic and social skills, that will prepare pupils for success in higher education and life beyond.
Most lessons at MCE are taught through the medium of English, and English is the predominant language used within the College. From Nursery through to Year 12 an enhanced form of the English National Curriculum is offered. This programme allows for a balance between necessary academic structure and student-led inquiry-based learning. Child-centred learning is a key focus, enabling all individuals to explore and develop their strengths.
In Year 9 pupils begin the International GCSE prior to moving to the Sixth Form to study their final qualification before graduation. 
From September 2018 MCE has offered a full complement of A-Levels courses within our Sixth Form. MCE has also successfully applied to become a candidate school to offer the International Baccalaureate Diploma Programme (IBDP) and is currently undertaking the full 2-year authorisation process.  MCE began teaching the IBDP courses in August 2019. 
MCE has a commitment to providing academic support and challenge to all pupils, across the ability range.  There is a focus on achieving excellent examination results that will enable pupils to be accepted into the most highly regarded universities both in the UK and internationally.  However, the College also aims to allow pupils to flourish in areas such as sport, drama or music and offers a wide variety of enrichment programmes.

As of 2017 facilities include a library, science laboratory, media centre, music studios, music practice rooms, a 25 m six-lane swimming pool, a beginners’ pool, a basketball court, a 5-a-side FIFA 2 standard all-weather pitch, a 450-seat theatre, food technology room and an art and design technology workshops. Additionally, there is a medical centre, a coffee shop and a central piazza.

Malvern College International Schools 
Since opening its first international school in 2012, the Malvern College Family of Schools has continued to expand its portfolio across the world. This includes:

 Malvern College Qingdao, opened in 2012
 Malvern College Chengdu, opened in 2015
 Malvern College Egypt, opened in 2016
 Malvern College Pre-School Hong Kong, opened in 2017
 Malvern College Hong Kong, opened in 2018
 Malvern College Switzerland, opened in 2021

See also 
List of international schools
Lists of schools by country
List of schools in Egypt
New Cairo
Maadi

References

External links
Malvern College Egypt

Schools
Egypt

2016 establishments in Egypt
Educational institutions established in 2016